Maleficent is a fictional character that first appeared in the 1959 Disney film Sleeping Beauty.

Maleficent may also refer to:

 Maleficent (franchise), a Disney media franchise
 Maleficent (film), a 2014 film
 Maleficent: Mistress of Evil, the 2019 sequel

See also
 Maleficium (disambiguation)